NACM is a four-letter acronym that may refer to:

National Association for Chiropractic Medicine
National Association of Credit Management
National Association for Court Management